Bräcke is a locality and the seat of Bräcke Municipality in Jämtland County, Sweden with 1,651 inhabitants in 2010.

The community is located next to Lake Revsundssjön, 70 km south-east of Östersund.   
The railway has been an important factor in Bräcke's development. The town is located along the Central line and is the starting point of the Main Line Through Upper Norrland. European route E14 also passes through Bräcke and Länsväg 323 starts in Bräcke and goes towards Kälarne.

Bräcke Church (Bräcke kyrka) was built in the summer of 1859 following a drawing by Abraham Rafael Ulric Pettersson (1824-1866). The church building is externally clad with white painted wooden paneling. The ceiling of the church room has a thin vault of wood.  The altarpiece was painted in 1926 by Stockholm artist Karl Tirén (1869-1955).  In the church tower hang two bells; the little bell was cast in 1778 and  large bell was cast in 1859.

Climate 
Bräcke has a subarctic climate influenced by its interior elevated plateau position transitioning between the coastal and mountainous regions of Norrland. This renders a variable climate prone to summer frosts. The annual temperature is usually just above . Compared to Torpshammar not far to its east, Bräcke is relatively cold due to the elevation difference. Being in a relative rain shadow from the Scandinavian Mountains, winter snow packs are usually moderate.

References

External links

Populated places in Bräcke Municipality
Municipal seats of Jämtland County
Jämtland
Swedish municipal seats